Chantal Gorostegui (born 20 January 1965) is a former French racing cyclist. She won the French national road race title in 1994.

References

External links

1965 births
Living people
French female cyclists
Sportspeople from Pyrénées-Orientales
Cyclists from Occitania (administrative region)